Langdon Lake is reservoir located in the Umatilla National Forest of Northeastern Oregon, United States. 
It is an impoundment of Morning Creek,
and the source of Lookingglass Creek, a tributary of the Grande Ronde River.

Surrounding the lake is the small community of Tollgate. The lake is privately owned but a campground is nearby.

See also 
 List of lakes in Oregon

References 

Reservoirs in Oregon
Lakes of Umatilla County, Oregon
Protected areas of Umatilla County, Oregon
Umatilla National Forest